The 1938-39 English National League season was the fourth season of the English National League, the top level ice hockey league in England. Six teams participated in the league, and the Harringay Greyhounds won the championship.

Streatham was suspended from the league early in the season, by the Association, for the use of players who had previously been subjected to disciplinary action, and were thus ineligible, in two matches.

Regular season

References 

Eng
Engl
Engl
English National League seasons
1938 in ice hockey
1939 in ice hockey